Kalayaan, is a Filipino word for liberty or freedom. It may refer to:

 Kalayaan, Laguna, a municipality in the province of Laguna, Philippines
 Kalayaan, Palawan, a municipality in the province of Palawan, Philippines
Kalayaan Islands part of the disputed Spratly Islands in the South China Sea
 Kalayaan Avenue, a major thoroughfare in Metro Manila, Philippines
 Kalayaan (charity), UK advocacy group for migrant domestic workers
 Kalayaan, the official publication of Filipino revolutionary group Katipunan.